Yasha may refer to:

People with the name
 Gu Yasha (born 1990), Chinese footballer
 Nidhi Yasha (born 1983), Indian costume designer
 Yasha Asley (born 2003), British mathematics child prodigy
 Yasha Khalili (born 1988), Iranian footballer
 Yasha Levine (born 1981), Russian-American investigative journalist and author
 Yasha Malekzad (born 1984), English music video director and producer
 Yasha Manasherov (born 1980), Israeli Greco-Roman amateur wrestler

Arts and entertainment

Anime and manga
 Yasha (manga), a Japanese manga series by Akimi Yoshida
 Yasha Gozen, a Japanese one-shot manga by Ryoko Yamagishi
 Yashahime: Princess Half-Demon, a Japanese anime series and the sequel to Inuyasha

Fictional characters
 Yasha, in the 1904 Russian play The Cherry Orchard by Anton Chekhov
 Yasha, in the 1990 Soviet adventure film Passport
 Yasha, in the 1993 Japanese anime film Yu Yu Hakusho: The Movie
 Yasha, in the 2012 Japanese action video game Asura's Wrath
 Yasha Nydoorin, in the American D&D web series Critical Role
 Yasha-ō, in the Japanese manga series RG Veda

Other uses
 Yasha or yaksha, nature-spirits in Hindu and Buddhist mythology, sometimes depicted as demonic warriors

See also
 
 
 Yash (disambiguation)
 Yaksha (disambiguation)
 Yeshua (disambiguation)